"The Curse of Mr. Bean" is the third episode of the British television series Mr. Bean, produced by Tiger Television for Thames Television. It was first broadcast on ITV on 30 December 1990 and was watched by 13.8 million viewers during its original transmission. It won the 1991 International Emmy Award for Outstanding Popular Arts Programme.

Plot

Act 1: The Swimming Pool
Bean visits a local swimming pool and parks his Mini in the nearby car park. After being ordered off of a  children's slide by a  lifeguard, Bean notices the diving boards and decides to dive off the topmost one, but he becomes frightened when he realizes how high up it is. As two boys watch, Bean starts to climb off the edge of the board. When he is hanging by one hand, one of the boys goes and stomps on his hand, causing him to plummet into the pool. Upon surfacing, Bean finds that his swimsuit has come off; a girl fishes it out of the pool and takes it with her just as the lifeguard orders everyone out. The left naked Bean waits until the pool is empty and stealthily tries to get back to the changing rooms, only to encounter a group of female swimmers who scream in terror.

After drying off and changing back into his clothes, Bean finds that he must pay £16 in order to exit the car park. Not wanting to pay, Bean pushes a rubbish bin into the entrance to trick the machine into issuing a ticket to open the gate. He drives his Mini out, but as he moves the bin out of the way, a car drives in and forces him to reverse back into the car park. Bean suddenly spots the blue Reliant about to enter the car park. As the driver takes a ticket from the machine and opens the gate, Bean speeds out of the car park, causing the Reliant to topple over.

Act 2: Lunch in the Park 
Heading for the park for lunch, Bean greets a man (Angus Deayton) who is also having lunch while sitting on a bench. Spotting him having a sandwich, Bean sets about making his own using ingredients and tools he stuffed into his coat. He cuts two slices of bread from a loaf with scissors, spreads butter on them with his credit card, washes lettuce under a drinking fountain's water before using his sock to spin it dry, kills two sardines he takes out of a jar and then crushes peppercorns folded into a handkerchief using his shoe. After making his sandwich, Bean notices the man sipping some tea, and prepares to make his own using a hot water bottle, putting a teabag into it while placing the bottle's stopper in his ear. He then proceeds to suck up milk from a baby bottle and spit it into the water in the hot water bottle, before sloshing it together. As he prepares to have his lunch, he ties his handkerchief around his neck, opting to use it as a napkin, only for the pepper traces on it to cause him to sneeze, making him drop his sandwich onto the ground and spray his tea all over himself, ruining his own lunch. The man, witnessing this, offers Bean the other half of his pre-packed sandwich as replacement, much to Bean's gratitude as the cap pops out of his ear.

Act 3: The Horror Film 
Driving to meet up with his girlfriend Irma Gobb at the cinema, Bean is temporarily stopped at the intersection by a set of traffic lights, but upon seeing a cyclist push his bike manually, he opts to do the same with his Mini and push it round to the road he wants to take, before driving off. Arriving at the cinema, Bean prepares to watch a horror film which appears to be titled A Nightmare (the film poster shown is that of A Nightmare on Elm Street 5: The Dream Child, depicting Freddy Krueger, with the camera placed to cut off the last words) with Irma, providing them with popcorn – a large tub for himself along with a hidden drink in his top, and a small tub for Irma, stealing some from her tub but scolding her when she tries to do the same. Before the film begins, Bean teases her by scaring her with silly practical jokes. However, as the film begins, he soon finds himself being scared witless with the various scenes frightening him to the point he tries to avoid watching it, even trying to force Irma to leave with him only to be forced to remain in his seat. Bean then tries to cover his head with his sweater, causing Irma to scream when she thinks his head has been cut off. Finally, Bean manages to find a solution by using some popcorn as earplugs, and using the popcorn tub to cover his eyes from the film. This works, and he manages to avoid the remaining scenes. As everyone begins to leave as the film ends, Bean fails to notice that Irma put her coat over her like a cape, causing the pair to scream in fright when Bean finds her coat arm empty, ending the episode.

Cast 
 Rowan Atkinson − Mr. Bean
 Angus Deayton – pool attendant; man on the park bench
 Matilda Ziegler – Irma Gobb (The Girlfriend)

Production notes 
The swimming pool sequence was filmed entirely at the Hayes Pool and Fitness Centre, rebuilt and renamed in 2010.  with the car park sequences at the Heathrow Bowling car park and the short traffic lights scene in Twickenham at the junction of Staines Road, Hospital Bridge Road and Sixth Cross Road. This was the last episode to be produced with an OB unit. Studio sequences were recorded before a live audience at Thames Television's Teddington Studios. This also marked the first appearance of Bean's 1977 Leyland Mini 1000.

The Curse of Mr Bean went onto win the 1991 International Emmy Award for Outstanding Popular Arts Programme.

References

External links 
 

Mr. Bean episodes
1990 British television episodes
Television shows written by Rowan Atkinson
Television shows written by Richard Curtis
Television shows written by Robin Driscoll